Dibaj (also Romanized as Dibadj; formerly known as Qal‘eh (Persian: قلعه), Chahārdeh, Chārdeh, and Chehārdeh) is a city in the Central District of Damghan County, Semnan Province, Iran. At the 2006 census, its population was 2,504, in 680 families.

It is situated along the Mazandaran road, and is the main town in northern Damghan County. It was formerly named Chahardeh, a set of villages which was elevated to township status in 1995.

Geography
Located at the heart of Alborz, near the source of Damghan River, which starts from here and later combine with Ali Spring (Cheshmeh Ali) waters and pass through Damghan city to Dasht-e Kavir. It's very cold in Winter but nice in Summer. The main permanent spring, Sar Cheshmeh make the region fertile for Agriculture and Gardening.

History 
There is not too much to say about this small town, but locals say the story of Zand dynasty invasion.  Karim Khan's half brother, Zaki Khan invaded here pursuing Qajar troops.  The people of village escaped to mountain.  He took an oath on a brick, saying: "I swear to this (addressing the brick in his hand), not to harm you".  Peasants thought he swore to Quran, the Muslim holy book, came down, faced a massacre and their village devastated by Zand troops.

Later, Karim Khan defeated Mohammad Hassan Khan Qajar, to show his kindness to Qajar tribe, assigns Hosseyn Qoli Khan (elder son of Qajar Khan) to rule Damghan county, and keeps Agha Mohammad Khan with himself in Shiraz.  Once the people of a village near Dibaj, rebelled against Hosseyn Qoli; in response, he burned the village. Hence, he is called Jahansooz (the burner of world).

Etymology 
Earlier, called Chahardeh, as it was a set of 4 villages.  Qaleh, Varzan, Zardavan and Amin Abad.  Chahardeh means Four Villages, Chahar is the Indo-Iranian word for 4 and Deh is for Village.  But actually now, there are only 3 villages, as Amin Abad destroyed by natural causes like earthquake, flood and/or as it is said by military invasion.  Today, Amina abbad called by local people, Kherab Deh means ruined/destroyed village.

When the Chahardeh changed to town, the name Dibaj was chosen. Adopted from an Imamzadeh on the south-west of town, in Qaleh village. The tomb said to be for Mohammad son of Imam Sadeq known as Mohammad-i-Dibaj. Dibaj is arabized for Persian Diba (Silk).

People 
The people are mostly Shia Muslim.  Their language is very near to Mazandarani however has many words which Damghanis use and even used by other dialects of Iranian languages. For example, the words like Khin, Dee, Bashim, Banish can be seen in Lori dialects.

Agriculture, gardening and industry 
The main garden products are walnuts, apple, cherry, Sour Cherry and Apricot.  Peasants also grow wheat and potato.

There is an Aluminium casting factory near the town which produces car engine parts.  A facial tissue plant is planned to be built also.

See also 

 Damghan County
 Damghan
 Mazandarani people

Sources
 Tarikhe Damghan- Keshavarz, Mohammad Ali, Qomes Publishing, Tehran, 1993

References

External links 
 City website
 Dibaj weblog

Populated places in Damghan County
Cities in Semnan Province